Vali Yusif oghlu Akhundov (– 22 August 1986), also spelled as Vali Akhundov, was the 10th First Secretary of Azerbaijan Communist Party, politician and scientist.

Early life
Akhundov was born in Baku, in the  Baku Governorate of the Russian Empire in 1916. In 1941, he graduated from Azerbaijan State Medical Institute and completed his research in 1964 receiving PhD in Medical Sciences and obtaining a title of a Professor and academician in 1964 and 1966, respectively. From 1946 through 1949, Akhundov served as the Chairman of Committee of Trade Union of Medical Workers. In 1949, he was appointed Deputy Minister of Public Health of Azerbaijan SSR and left the post for the position of Deputy Chief of the Central Committee of Communist Party of Azerbaijan SSR in 1953 and in 1954 was appointed the Minister of Public Health of Azerbaijan SSR which he held until 1958. Akhundov served as the Chairman of the Council of Ministers for a period of one year and was eventually appointed the First Secretary of the Central Committee of the Communist Party of Azerbaijan SSR, a position he held until 1969 when he was replaced by Heydar Aliyev.

Scientific activity
Academician V.Y.Akhundov is the author of more than 400 scientific works, including 6 monographs, and editor of many scientific collections and works. Veli Akhundov’s monographs are the result of his many years of research. Most of his scientific works are primarily devoted to the study of various aspects of environmental hygiene, and doubtless the contribution of V.Y.Akhundov to the hygienic science and sanitary practice of Azerbaijan is indisputable.  In addition to water supply, he paid much attention to the problem of rural hygiene, soil hygiene, including in connection with the use of mineral fertilizers, bacterial contamination of dwellings, problems of infectious pathology due to the sanitary condition of rural settlements in 1960-70. The distinctive features of scientific works of V.Y.Akhundov are their indispensable, organic connection with life and actual problems of practical public health.

First Secretary of Communist Party
Veli Akhundov succeeded Imam Mustafayev who served as the First Secretary from February 1954 to 1959. During his career, Akhundov was blamed for the economic crisis and was accused of corruption. In the mid 1960s, the number of ethnic Azerbaijanis in the Azerbaijan Communist Party apparatus grew making up 61%, however, many key posts were still held by ethnic Russians and Armenians. Akhundov is credited in Azerbaijan for rebuffing the Armenian claims for Nagorno-Karabakh Autonomous Oblast in 1965 while he was in office.

After the end of political career, Akhundov served as the Vice President of the Azerbaijan National Academy of Sciences until 1972. He was then the principal at the Institute of Virology, Microbiology and Hygiene until his death in 1986.

Awards
Akhundov has been awarded with Order of Lenin, Order of the Red Star, Order of the Patriotic War and other ordens and medals of honor throughout his political and scientific career.

References

1916 births
1986 deaths
Politicians from Baku
People from Baku Governorate
Azerbaijani atheists
First secretaries of the Azerbaijan Communist Party
Azerbaijan Medical University alumni
Recipients of the Order of Lenin
Recipients of the Order of the Red Star
Central Committee of the Communist Party of the Soviet Union members
Sixth convocation members of the Supreme Soviet of the Soviet Union
Seventh convocation members of the Supreme Soviet of the Soviet Union
Heads of the government of the Azerbaijan Soviet Socialist Republic
Burials at II Alley of Honor